Mark E. Hutton (born August 5, 1954) is an American politician. He served as a Republican member for the 105th district in the Kansas House of Representatives from 2013 to 2017. In 2016, he was given a lifetime rating of 88% by the American Conservative Union. He is married with two children. He was appointed to the Kansas Board of Regents by Gov. Jeff Colyer in 2018 for a four-year term.

References

1954 births
Living people
Kansas State University alumni
Republican Party members of the Kansas House of Representatives
Politicians from Wichita, Kansas
21st-century American politicians
Kansas Board of Regents